The Teen Series is a popular name for a group of American combat aircraft. The name stems from a series of American supersonic jet fighters built for the United States Air Force and the United States Navy during the late 20th century. The designations system was the 1962 United States Tri-Service aircraft designation system, which reset the F-# sequence. The term typically includes the Grumman F-14 Tomcat, McDonnell Douglas F-15 Eagle, General Dynamics F-16 Fighting Falcon, and McDonnell Douglas F/A-18 Hornet.

Unsuccessful experimental and prototype fighters assigned numbers in the teen range (13–19) are generally not considered part of the series. Thus it does not include the Northrop YF-17, which later evolved into the F/A-18. The designations F-13 and F-19 were not assigned.

See also
 Century Series (US fighters of the 1950s and early 1960s)
 F-19 (hypothetical US fighter aircraft)
 Lockheed F-117A Nighthawk
 Lockheed YF-12 Blackbird
 Northrop F-20 Tigershark
 List of military aircraft of the United States

Footnotes 

Bibliography
 Spick, Mike, ed. The Great Book of Modern Warplanes. St. Paul Minnesota: MBI, 2000. .

Fighter aircraft
United States fighter aircraft
United States Teen series fighters